The executive branch of the central government of the People's Republic of China, the 14th State Council, is currently made up of 26 Constituent Departments of the State Council.

The 26 cabinet-level executive departments are:
 21 ministries,
 3 commissions (Development and Reform, Ethnic Affairs, and Health),
 the People's Bank of China as the central bank, and
 the National Audit Office.

Executive chiefs of each department (ministers in charge of the ministries and commissions, governor of the People's Bank, and auditor-general of the National Audit Office), along with the State Council's premier, vice-premiers, state councilors, and secretary-general, are ex officio members of the cabinet, officially named the Constituent Members of the State Council, who together determine major issues at normally semi-annual Plenary Meetings of the State Council .

List of current Constituent Departments

List of former Constituent Departments

Dissolved ministries

Dissolved commissions

See also 

 Executive Yuan (the Republic of China equivalent of the State Council)
 Three Departments and Six Ministries (Imperial China)

External links 
 Ministers on English.gov.cn